The 1936 season was Syracuse University's 17 season fielding a men's varsity soccer team. The team played their home matches at Archbold Stadium, and were coached by Arthur Horrocks in their tenth season as head coach.

Guido Semino lead the Orangemen in goals scored scoring 23 goals across eight matches.

Roster 
The following individuals were letterwinners for the 1936 season.

Schedule 

|-
!colspan=8 style=""| Regular season
|-

|-

References

External links 
 Syracuse Men's Soccer Record Book

Syracuse Orange
Syracuse Orange men's soccer seasons
Intercollegiate Soccer Football Association Championship-winning seasons
Syracuse Orange men's soccer
Syracuse Orange